Andrew Turnbull ( – 20 June 2012) was a Scottish rugby union and professional rugby league footballer who played in the 1940s and 1950s. Drew Turnbull served with the Duke of Wellington's Regiment.

Playing career

International honours
Turnbull won a cap for Great Britain (RL) while at Leeds in 1951 against New Zealand.

Turnbull also represented Great Britain (RL) while at Leeds between 1952 and 1956 against France (1 non-Test match).

Turnbull was selected to face Australia on the 1952–53 Kangaroo tour of Great Britain and France but had to withdraw due to injury, and played in two non-Test matches in the 1954 Great Britain Lions Tour of Australia and New Zealand, before having to return prematurely due to injury.

County League appearances
Turnbull played in Leeds' victories in the Yorkshire County League during the 1950–51 season and 1954–55 season.

Club career
Turnbull made his début, and scored a try for Leeds on Saturday 21 August 1948 against Bramley at Headingley Rugby Stadium, and he played his last match for Leeds against Castleford at Headingley Stadium on Saturday 18 February 1956.

Career records
With 228 tries, Turnbull is fourth on Leeds' all-time list of try scorers. Only Eric Harris, who did it three times, has bettered Turnbull's 41 tries in a league season for Leeds, set in 1954–55. Along with Fred Webster and Eric Harris, Turnbull was one of only three players to have scored six or more tries in a game for the club, achieving a double hat-trick against Batley on Monday 28 December 1953.

Note
References variously spell Turnbull's surname correctly as Turnbull, or incorrectly as Turnball.

References

External links
!Great Britain Statistics at englandrl.co.uk (statistics currently missing due to not having appeared for both Great Britain, and England)
Obituary at announce.jpress.co.uk

1930 births
2012 deaths
Duke of Wellington's Regiment soldiers
Great Britain national rugby league team players
Halifax R.L.F.C. players
Hawick RFC players
Leeds Rhinos players
Place of birth missing
Place of death missing
Rugby league wingers
Rugby league players from Hawick
Rugby union players from Hawick
Scottish rugby league players
Scottish rugby union players